Bogdan Volodimirovich Savenko (born 20 November 1974), is a Ukrainian retired professional ice hockey player. He played for multiple teams during his career, though primarily with Sokil Kyiv, which lasted from 1990 until 2011. He played internationally for the Ukrainian national team at several World Championships, as well as the 2002 Winter Olympics.

Career statistics

Regular season and playoffs

International

External links
 

1974 births
Living people
Bilyi Bars Bila Tserkva players
Chicago Blackhawks draft picks
HC Berkut players
HC Havířov players
HC Slezan Opava players
HC Spartak Moscow players
Ice hockey players at the 2002 Winter Olympics
Indianapolis Ice players
KalPa players
Lukko players
Niagara Falls Thunder players
Olympic ice hockey players of Ukraine
Port Huron Border Cats players
Quebec Rafales players
ShVSM Kyiv players
SKA Saint Petersburg players
Sokil Kyiv players
Soviet ice hockey right wingers
Sportspeople from Kyiv
Syracuse Crunch players
Ukrainian expatriate sportspeople in Canada
Ukrainian expatriate sportspeople in the United States
Ukrainian ice hockey right wingers
Vaasan Sport players
Ukrainian expatriate sportspeople in Finland
Ukrainian expatriate sportspeople in Switzerland
Ukrainian expatriate sportspeople in the Czech Republic
Ukrainian expatriate sportspeople in Russia
Ukrainian expatriate ice hockey people
Expatriate ice hockey players in Russia
Expatriate ice hockey players in Switzerland
Expatriate ice hockey players in the Czech Republic
Expatriate ice hockey players in Canada